Rebecca Leigh "Becky" Spencer (born 22 February 1991) is a professional footballer who plays as a goalkeeper for FA WSL club Tottenham Hotspur and the Jamaica women's national team. After coming through the ranks at Arsenal, she had spent short spells with French club ASJ Soyaux and Birmingham City before returning to Arsenal ahead of the 2013 FA WSL. She spent two-and-a-half more years with Birmingham City, before joining Chelsea in January 2016. Born in England, Spencer represented England at Under-19 and Under-20 levels and now represents Jamaica at senior international level.

Early life
Born in Northwick Park, Spencer attended Rooks Heath College and in January 2009 was a fitness student in St Albans.

Club career
Spencer began her career as a junior with Watford Ladies before joining the Centre of Excellence at Arsenal Ladies in 2001. She progressed through the centre of excellence age groups and joined the senior team in 2006, where she was primarily the understudy to first choice keeper Emma Byrne. She made her FA Women's Premier League debut and in April 2008 was in goal as Arsenal beat Millwall Lionesses 3–1 in the London Cup Final, having been in the Arsenal side beaten by Charlton Athletic Ladies in the 2006 final.

Spencer was an unused substitute in the 2008 FA Women's Cup Final as Arsenal beat Leeds Carnegie and in the 2009 final as Arsenal beat Sunderland. She has also won an FA Women's Premier League Cup winners' medal having been an unused substitute for Arsenal's win against Leeds in March 2007.

Spencer joined Gillingham Ladies on loan for 2010–11. She said "I have had a frustrating few years regarding getting regular game time and Gillingham has been the right choice of club to do this." In December 2011 Spencer left Arsenal for French Division 1 Féminine club ASJ Soyaux. She returned to England in March 2012 for family reasons. Spencer then signed for Birmingham City, making her debut in a 4–0 FA Women's Cup win over Sunderland. She went on to play a pivotal role as Birmingham defeated Chelsea in the 2012 FA Women's Cup Final on penalties.

Spencer left Arsenal for a second time in July 2013. She returned to Birmingham City. In January 2016, Spencer announced her transfer from Birmingham to WSL champions Chelsea. Birmingham described the transfer fee banked from Chelsea as "an extremely good deal for the club".

Spencer moved to West Ham United in June 2018. She made 12 league appearances and four in the FA Women's League Cup. She was an unused substitute in the side that played against Manchester City in the 2018–19 FA Women's Cup final. In June 2019, it was announced that Spencer would leave West Ham upon the expiration of her contract.

International career
Spencer has represented England at Under–15, Under–19 and Under–20 level. She was the first choice for the Under–20s World Cup side in 2008. In 2009, she was a key player as England's Under–19s side won the UEFA European Women's Under-19 Championship in Belarus, keeping clean sheets throughout the tournament, and was named as one of ten 'emerging talents' from the tournament on the UEFA website. She was called up to Mark Sampson's senior England squad in 2016 and was an unused substitute against Estonia.

Spencer also qualifies for Jamaica through her heritage and received her first call-up to the Jamaican national team in June 2021. During that camp, Spencer made her senior international debut in a 1–0 win over Nigeria. She wears the number 13 jersey.

References

External links
Interview with Becky Spencer at KeeperPortal.co.uk
Becky Spencer at Footofeminin.fr

1991 births
Living people
Citizens of Jamaica through descent
Jamaican women's footballers
Women's association football goalkeepers
ASJ Soyaux-Charente players
Division 1 Féminine players
Jamaica women's international footballers
Jamaican expatriate women's footballers
Jamaican expatriate sportspeople in France
Expatriate women's footballers in France
Sportspeople from London
English women's footballers
Arsenal W.F.C. players
Birmingham City W.F.C. players
Chelsea F.C. Women players
Gillingham L.F.C. players
West Ham United F.C. Women players
Nottingham Forest Women F.C. players
Tottenham Hotspur F.C. Women players
FA Women's National League players
Women's Super League players
English expatriate women's footballers
English expatriate sportspeople in France
English sportspeople of Jamaican descent
Black British sportswomen